The 45th Guldbagge Awards ceremony, presented by the Swedish Film Institute, honored the best Swedish films of 2009, and took place on 25 January 2010, and was hosted by Johan Glans, for the second year in a row. The Girl with the Dragon Tattoo directed by Niels Arden Oplev was presented with the award for Best Film.

Winner and nominees

Awards

See also
 82nd Academy Awards
 67th Golden Globe Awards
 63rd British Academy Film Awards
 16th Screen Actors Guild Awards
 15th Critics' Choice Awards
 30th Golden Raspberry Awards

References

External links
Official website
Guldbaggen on Facebook
Guldbaggen on Twitter
45th Guldbagge Awards at Internet Movie Database

2010 in Sweden
2009 film awards
Guldbagge Awards ceremonies
2000s in Stockholm
January 2010 events in Europe